There are over 9,000 Grade I listed buildings in England. This page is a list of these buildings in the district of Harrogate in North Yorkshire.

Harrogate

|}

Notes

References

External links

Harrogate (borough)
Borough of Harrogate
Harrogate